Cockrell Hill Transfer Location is a bus-only station located along Jefferson Boulevard, west of Cockrell Hill Rd. in Dallas, Texas (USA).

Unlike many transit centers, Cockrell Hill Transfer Location does not provide parking, however it does provide indoor seating in an air conditioned facility available during weekday rush hours.

Connecting bus routes

References

Dallas Area Rapid Transit
Bus stations in Dallas